The Annunciation Greek Orthodox Cathedral is a Greek Orthodox cathedral located in Chicago, Illinois. It is the mother church of the Metropolis of Chicago. The current membership includes some 400 families.

History

The Annunciation Greek Orthodox Cathedral was established in 1892 by a Greek immigrant community from Laconia and the Greek Islands. In 1909, the Greek Orthodox community paid $18,000 for the lot of city land on which the cathedral stands today.

In 1910, the cathedral was complete with a total cost of around $100,000. It was built after an Athenian cathedral and is currently the oldest surviving Chicago building in the style of a Byzantine church.

The burden of the Great Depression prompted the Greek Orthodox community to rally together and save the churches from financial ruin through various fundraising activities. Also in this era, the entire building was raised from its foundation and moved back to accommodate for the widening of LaSalle Street.

Gallery

References

Religious organizations established in 1892
Churches completed in 1910
20th-century Eastern Orthodox church buildings
Eastern Orthodox churches in Illinois
Byzantine Revival architecture in Illinois
Greek Orthodox cathedrals in the United States
Cathedrals in Chicago